Robert L. Updike House is a historic home located at Charlottesville, Virginia. It was built in 1904, and is a two-story, three bay, vernacular Colonial Revival style brick dwelling.  It has a steep gable roof and features a full height portico on the front facade.

It was listed on the National Register of Historic Places in 1983.

References

Houses on the National Register of Historic Places in Virginia
Colonial Revival architecture in Virginia
Houses completed in 1904
Houses in Charlottesville, Virginia
National Register of Historic Places in Charlottesville, Virginia